Criggion railway station was a station in Criggion, Powys, Wales. The station opened in 1871 and closed in 1932. The station house now forms two private residences.

References

Further reading

Disused railway stations in Powys
Railway stations in Great Britain opened in 1871
Railway stations in Great Britain closed in 1932